Mahela is a rural municipality located in the Atsinanana region of eastern Madagascar, It is located in the Antanambao Manampotsy (district).

References

Populated places in Atsinanana